"Don't Be Cruel" is a song by American singer Bobby Brown. Taken from his second studio album of the same name, the song was written and produced by the songwriting and production duo Kenneth "Babyface" Edmonds and Antonio "L.A." Reid, with additional writing by Daryl Simmons.

Chart performance
"Don't Be Cruel" was Brown's second single to reach the top position of the R&B chart, where it remained for two weeks. As a pop crossover, it rose from number 59 to number 49, on the US Billboard Hot 100 singles chart, on the week of August 13, 1988, and took two months to peak at number eight on the week of October 15, 1988.

Charts

Weekly charts

Year-end charts

Certifications

References

1988 singles
1988 songs
Bobby Brown songs
MCA Records singles
Music videos directed by Alek Keshishian
New jack swing songs
Song recordings produced by Babyface (musician)
Song recordings produced by L.A. Reid
Songs written by Babyface (musician)
Songs written by Daryl Simmons
Songs written by L.A. Reid